Unihan font was developed by Ross Paterson in 1993. 

Unihan font had two variations, 16×16 and 24×24 bitmap fonts. These covered most of the CJK Auxiliary and Unihan portions of Unicode 1.1. Font files were in HBF (and bin) format (BDF). The bitmaps in bin files were derived from GB 2312, Big5, JIS X 0208, KSC 5601 (now called KS X 1001) and CCCII fonts.

See also
 List of typefaces (List of fonts)
 Unicode typefaces

Endnotes
 README on unihan16.hbf, unihan24.hbf font by Ross Paterson. (at ibiblio.org).

External links
 Unihan font, described by Roman Czyborra.

Unicode typefaces
Typefaces and fonts introduced in 1993